The men's trap shooting event at the 2015 Pan American Games will be held between the 13 and 14 of July at the Pan Am Shooting Centre in Innisfil.

The event consisted of two rounds: a qualifier and a final. In the qualifier, each shooter fired 5 sets of 25 shots in trap shooting.

The top 6 shooters in the qualifying round moved on to the final round. There, they fired one additional round of 25. The total score from all 150 shots was used to determine final ranking. Ties are broken using a shoot-off; additional shots are fired one pair at a time until there is no longer a tie.

The winners of all fifteen events, along with the runner up in the men's air rifle, skeet, trap and both women's rifle events will qualify for the 2016 Summer Olympics in Rio de Janeiro, Brazil (granted the athlete has not yet earned a quota for their country).

Schedule
All times are Central Standard Time (UTC-6).

Results

Qualification round

Semifinal

Finals

Bronze-medal match

Gold-medal match

References

Shooting at the 2015 Pan American Games